Guilt by Association may refer to:
 Association fallacy, sometimes called guilt by association
 Felony murder rule
 Guilty by Association (album), the debut album by State of Shock
 Guilt by Association, an album by Creaming Jesus
 Guilt by Association Vol. 1, album by Engine Room Recordings
 Guilt by Association Vol. 2, album by Engine Room Recordings
 Guilt by Association Vol. 3, album by Engine Room Recordings
 Guilty by Association (film), 2003 American film starring Morgan Freeman